Return to Love may refer to

A Return to Love, 1992 book by author Marianne Williamson
Return to Love Tour 2000 concert tour by American singing group Diana Ross and the Supremes
Return to Love, album by Nana Mouskouri